The Journal of Antibiotics is a peer-reviewed medical journal published by the Nature Publishing Group for the Japan Antibiotics Research Association.

The journal seeks to endorse studies on antibiotics and associated types of biologically-active substances. 

In June 2020, the journal published a pioneer systematic review on ivermectin and COVID-19 by Fatemeh Heiday and Reza Gharebaghi which has become highly cited.

References

External links 
 

Microbiology journals
Nature Research academic journals
Monthly journals
Publications established in 1948
English-language journals
Academic journals associated with learned and professional societies